Greg Charles Edwards is an American musician and songwriter, best known as guitarist and bassist for the rock band Failure. Edwards is a multi-instrumentalist. As a professional musician, he has been active since the 1990 formation of Failure, and also plays guitar and sings in the experimental rock band Autolux. Edwards has 125 song titles to his credit.

Music career

Failure

Edwards' first band  was the Los Angeles-based Failure. That band was active from 1990 until 1997, when bandmate Ken Andrews dissolved the band, citing personal differences. The band re-formed in 2014 with drummer Kellii Scott and embarked on a North American tour before releasing new material in the form of The Heart is a Monster in 2015; as of 2022, they continue to tour and record, having released two more albums.

Replicants

After the completion of Failure's last studio album before the band officially dissolved, Edwards, along with bandmate Ken Andrews, former Tool bassist Paul D'Amour, and multi-instrumentalist Chris Pitman, formed the cover band Replicants. They released one self-titled record, Replicants in 1996.

Lusk

Following the release of Replicants and the dissolution of Failure, Paul D'Amour, Brad Laner, and Chris Pitman formed the band Lusk. Lusk released one album, Free Mars. Edwards played extensively on the first half of the album, contributing vocals, guitar, bass, drums, and synthesizers. Free Mars would go on to be nominated for a Grammy for Best Recording Package in 1997.

Autolux

Formed in 2000 with Carla Azar and Eugene Goreshter, Autolux is Edwards' most current band. They have recorded one promotional EP, Demonstration, and released three full-length studio albums, Future Perfect, in 2004, Transit Transit in August 2010, and Pussy's Dead in March 2016. Whereas he mostly plays bass in Failure, Edwards is the guitarist and co-lead vocalist in Autolux; he served as engineer on Transit Transit.

A Perfect Circle

Due to James Iha's commitments to The Smashing Pumpkins reunion, Greg Edwards was recruited by A Perfect Circle to play on the Spring leg of their 2018 American tour as well as on their 2018 European Tour.

Discography

With Autolux
Demonstration (EP) (2001)
Future Perfect (2004)
Transit Transit (2010)
Pussy's Dead (2016)

With Failure
Comfort (1992)
Magnified (1994)
Fantastic Planet (1996)
Golden (2004)
Essentials (2006)
Tree of Stars (2014)
The Heart Is a Monster (2015)
Fantastic Planet Live (2017)
In the Future Your Body Will Be The Furthest Thing From Your Mind (2018)
Wild Type Droid (2021)

With Replicants
Replicants (1996)

With Lusk
Free Mars (1997)

References

External links
Autolux official site
Failure official site

Year of birth missing (living people)
American male singers
American rock singers
Living people
Lead guitarists
American rock bass guitarists
Replicants (band) members
American male bass guitarists
Failure (band) members
Autolux members